Barátok közt (in English: Among Friends) was a Hungarian television soap opera aired on RTL Klub. Its premiere was on 26 October 1998 and its finale was on 17 July 2021.

Through its entire run, it had been screened as two episodes on every weekday. Since its premiere, Barátok közt was the most watched regular programme domestically in Hungary, with around 1.2 million viewers per night.

On 30 November 2020, in the wake of declining ratings, RTL Klub announced that the winter 2021 season would be the final season, bringing to an end the soap after 23 seasons and more than 10 000 episodes. The soap ended with a grand finale which aired in prime time, instead of its usual early evening slot, and ran for 40 minutes.

Synopsis 
The series takes place on the fictional Mátyás király tér (King Matthias Square) in Budapest. Barátok közt is about the life of the people living here, about the Berényi family and their family business. In the first episode the oldest one of the Berényi brothers, Zoltán Berényi dies and leaves his company to his wife, Claudia Berényi (Edit Ábrahám), his two brothers, Miklós (Zoltán Szőke) and András Berényi (died in 2013, portrayed by Péter R Kárpáti), Miklós’ wife, Nóra Balogh (divorced in 2005, portrayed by Izabella Varga), and his friend, László Novák (Csaba Tihanyi-Tóth).

Most of the characters are well known in Hungary, like Zsolt Bartha (Károly Rékasi), or Magdolna Kertész (Zsóka Fodor), whose death in 2009 was among the greatest news in the country.

International versions
The license of the series was sold in several countries in Europe. In Poland its local version, Na Wspólnej, premiered in January 2003 on TVN. The Slovakian version was canceled because of financial reasons. The Romanian version was also canceled due to low ratings.

References

External links
 
 
 Hivatalos honlap 

Hungarian television shows
2020s Hungarian television series
2010s Hungarian television series
2000s Hungarian television series
1990s Hungarian television series
1998 Hungarian television series debuts
2021 Hungarian television series endings
Hungarian-language television shows
RTL (Hungarian TV channel) original programming